Bushtown, Kentucky may refer to the following places in Kentucky, both in Mercer County:
Bushtown (east), Kentucky
Bushtown (west), Kentucky